Ray Cummings (born Raymond King Cummings) (August 30, 1887 –  January 23, 1957) was an American author of science fiction literature and comic books.

Early life

Cummings was born in New York City in 1887. He worked with Thomas Edison as a personal assistant and technical writer from 1914 to 1919.

Literary career
Cummings is identified as one of the "founding fathers" of the science fiction genre.  His most highly regarded fictional work was the novel The Girl in the Golden Atom published in 1922, which was a consolidation of a short story by the same name published in 1919 (where Cummings combined the idea of Fitz James O'Brien's The Diamond Lens with H. G. Wells's The Time Machine) and a sequel, The People of the Golden Atom, published in 1920.

Before taking book form, several of Cummings's stories appeared serialized in pulp magazines. The first eight chapters of his The Girl in the Golden Atom appeared in All-Story Magazine on March 15, 1919.

Ray Cummings wrote in "The Girl in the Golden Atom": "Time . . . is what keeps everything from happening at once", a sentence repeated by scientists such as C. J. Overbeck, and John Archibald Wheeler, and often misattributed to the likes of Einstein or Feynman. Cummings repeated this sentence in several of his novellas. Sources focus on his earlier work, The Time Professor, published in 1921, as its earliest documented usage.

Later work
During the 1940s, with his literary career in eclipse, Cummings anonymously scripted comic book stories for Timely Comics, the predecessor to Marvel Comics. He recycled the plot of The Girl in the Golden Atom for a two-part Captain America tale, Princess of the Atom (Captain America Comics #25 & 26). He also contributed stories to the Human Torch and Sub-Mariner, which his daughter Betty Cummings often penned.

Cummings died on January 22, 1957, at Mount Vernon, New York, of a cerebral hemorrhage.

Selected literary works
 The Girl in the Golden Atom, short story (1919)
 The People of the Golden Atom (1920)
 Moon Plot (Argosy c. 1920)
 The Girl in the Golden Atom, novel (1922)
 The Man Who Mastered Time (Argosy 1924)
 Brand New World (Argosy 1928)
 Snow Girl (Argosy 1929)
 The Shadow Girl (Argosy 1929)
 The Sea Girl (Argosy 1929)
 The Princess of the Atom (1929)
 Tama of the Light Country (Argosy 1930)
 Beyond the Vanishing Point, Astounding (March 1931)
 Brigands of the Moon (McClurg, 1931)
 Jungle Rebellion (Argosy 1931)
 Tama Princess of Mercury (Argosy 1931)
 Bandits of the Cylinder (Argosy 1931)
 Beyond the Stars, Future (February 1942)

References

External links
 Science Fiction inventions of Ray Cummings
 
 
 
 
 

1887 births
1957 deaths
Writers from New York City
American science fiction writers
20th-century American novelists
American male novelists
20th-century American male writers
Novelists from New York (state)
Golden Age comics creators